Jabal is an Arabic surname or male given name, which means "mountain". Alternative spellings include Jabel, Jebal, and Jebel. With regard to persons, the name may refer to:

Badawi al-Jabal (1905–1981), Syrian poet
Fathi Al-Jabal (born 1963), Tunisian football manager
Jabal ibn Jawwal, 7th century Arab poet
Jabel Robinson (1831–1907), Canadian politician
Muadh ibn Jabal (607–639), Arab companion of Muhammad

See also
Jabal (disambiguation)
Jubal (disambiguation)

References

Arabic-language surnames
Arabic masculine given names